Gulf Commercial Bank is an Iraqi commercial bank, headquartered in Baghdad.

The bank has 12 branches in Baghdad, Basrah, Najaf, Kerbala, Diwaniyeh, Babylon and Erbil.

See also
Iraqi dinar

References 
 https://web.archive.org/web/20071223044715/http://gulfbankiraq.com/bran.htm

External links
 Official website 

Companies based in Baghdad
Banks of Iraq
Banks established in 2000
Iraqi companies established in 2000
Companies listed on the Iraq Stock Exchange